Luton South is a constituency in Bedfordshire represented in the House of Commons of the UK Parliament since 2019 by Rachel Hopkins, a member of the Labour Party.

History
This seat was created in 1983, primarily from the former seat of Luton East.

The constituency and its predecessors the Luton East and Luton constituencies were long considered a bellwether (they had elected an MP from the winning party in each election since the 1951 general election). Margaret Moran, who was the Labour MP from 1997, stood down at the 2010 general election after falsifying claims for her expenses.

Bellwether status ended in the 2010 general election, when the constituency elected a Labour MP while the Conservatives were the largest party in the House of Commons. As a result, its new MP Gavin Shuker became one of just two Labour MPs elected in 2010 in the East of England, alongside Kelvin Hopkins, the MP for the Luton North seat. Shuker and Hopkins had served as MPs for the two divisions of Luton since then, with their majorities increasing in both elections since, although the majority in South has not been larger than that of North since 2001.

Boundaries and boundary changes

1983–1997: The Borough of Luton wards of Biscot, Crawley, Dallow, Farley, High Town, Putteridge, Saints, South, and Stopsley, and the District of South Bedfordshire wards of Caddington and Slip End.

This was a new Borough Constituency incorporating the abolished Borough Constituency of Luton East. It included the southernmost parts of the abolished Borough Constituency of Luton West and a small part from the south-east of the abolished County Constituency of South Bedfordshire.

1997–2010: The Borough of Luton wards of Biscott, Crawley, Dallow, Farley, High Town, Putteridge, South, and Stopsley, and the District of South Bedfordshire wards of Caddington and Slip End.

The Saints ward of the Borough of Luton transferred to Luton North.

2010–present: The Borough of Luton wards of Biscot, Crawley, Dallow, Farley, High Town, Round Green, South, Stopsley, and Wigmore, and the District of South Bedfordshire ward of Caddington, Hyde and Slip End.

There were marginal changes due to revision of local authority wards.

NB: the wards of the district of South Bedfordshire now form the bulk of the Caddington ward of the Central Bedfordshire unitary authority, the former wards having been abolished at the conversion to unitary councils in Bedfordshire in 2009.

Constituency profile

The constituency covers the southern and eastern areas of Luton, inclusive of the town centre and London Luton Airport. It also comprises the rural country house estate of Luton Hoo, in addition to the late medieval Someries Castle, and the villages/hamlets, extending south to the border of Hertfordshire and the town of Harpenden. The areas of Luton it spans include Stopsley, Wigmore, Butterfield Green, Hart Hill, Wardown Park, Bury Park, Dallow, Farley Hill, New Town, and Stockwood Park.

Outside of the actual Borough of Luton, it also encompasses the small village of East Hyde on the Hertfordshire border, as well as Slip End and Caddington, which are near the M1 motorway.

Demographically, the constituency is mixed, with large southern Asian communities in the Bury Park and Farley Hill areas. The largest community is White British, though Africans and Afro-Caribbeans, as well as newer immigrant arrivals from Eastern Europe, form substantial parts of the population.

The town centre features The Mall Luton (the town's main shopping centre), the University of Bedfordshire Luton campus, and various amenities such as The Galaxy entertainment complex, and Luton railway station on the Midland Main Line. Luton Town FC, currently of the Championship, is within the constituency, as would be their intended new home stadium at Power Court (to the immediate east of The Mall Luton). The railway station serving London Luton Airport, Luton Airport Parkway, is also within the constituency. A new rail link is being constructed between this station and the airport, which is due to be opened in 2021.

Vauxhall still makes vehicles in this area, although the operations have reduced greatly since a large part of the facility closed in the early 2000s.

Members of Parliament

Elections

Elections in the 2010s
Incumbent MP Gavin Shuker (formerly Labour) unsuccessfully sought reelection as an Independent candidate. On 2 November 2019, the Liberal Democrats decided not to stand a candidate and endorsed Shuker.

Elections in the 2000s

Elections in the 1990s

Elections in the 1980s

See also
List of parliamentary constituencies in Bedfordshire
Politics in Luton

Notes

References

Politics of Luton
Parliamentary constituencies in Bedfordshire
Constituencies of the Parliament of the United Kingdom established in 1983